

There are 322 properties and districts listed on the National Register in Chester County, Pennsylvania, United States.

Number of listings by region
For the purposes of this list, the county is split into three regions: Eastern, Northern, and Southern. Eastern Chester County is defined as being the municipalities south and east of a line extending from Phoenixville to Exton to West Chester; Northern Chester County is defined as being the municipalities north of the Philadelphia Main Line and west of a line extending from Phoenixville to Exton; and Southern Chester County is defined as being the municipalities south of the Philadelphia Main Line and west of West Chester. One district is split between Northern and Eastern Chester County.

See also 
 List of Pennsylvania state historical markers in Chester County

References